Waltz Time may refer to:

 Waltz Time (1933 film), a British musical film
 Waltz Time (1945 film), a British musical film